Elena Anne Ford-Niarchos (born May 25, 1966) is an American-Greek businesswoman. She is the Chief Customer Experience Officer at Ford Motor Company and the first female Ford family member to hold an executive position at the company.

Career
Ford worked in advertising as a senior account executive at Wells, Rich Greene Advertising in New York City. In 1995, she joined Ford Motor Company as a marketing executive. She was later named the company's director of global marketing and was responsible for marketing, product management, and sales support activities. During this time, she marketed the company's development into mobility services.

In 2012, Elena was assigned to lead the global Dealer and Consumer Experience group. She was responsible for standardizing the way dealerships interact with customers around the world and oversaw global dealer strategy, planning, training and consumer experience.

In 2013, Elena became Vice President, Customer Experience and Global Dealer, making her one of thirty-eight officers running the company and the first female Ford family member to hold an executive leadership position.

In October 2018, Elena Ford was announced as the company's first Chief Customer Experience Officer. In this role, she leads the organization in creating a world-class customer experience for all Ford customers.

In 2019, she spearheaded the launch of a 500-person call center in Houston, TX, providing support for Ford truck owners and dealers experiencing technical issues. She also launched Ford’s “Own the Call” initiative.

Life

Elena Anne Ford-Niarchos was born in New York City to Charlotte Ford and Greek shipping magnate Stavros Niarchos. After her parents divorced in 1967, Elena's mother married J. Anthony Forstmann in 1973 and later Edward Downe Jr., the founder and chairman of Downe Communications in 1986.

Elena is the great-great-granddaughter of company founder Henry Ford, and granddaughter of longtime Ford Motor Company president Henry Ford II. Elena was close to her maternal grandfather, Henry Ford II, once referring to him as her best friend. Henry taught Elena to drive a stick shift in his F-100 Ford pick-up truck insisting she learned to drive a manual and not an automatic.

Ford received a bachelor's degree in business from New York University. In 1991, she married Stanley Jozef Olender, the owner of Stanley O's, an estate maintenance service in Southampton, New York. In 1996, she divorced Olender and married Joseph Daniel Rippolone. In 2008, Ford and Rippolone divorced by mutual agreement.

In 1997 Ford and her half-siblings were involved in a dispute regarding their father’s estate. A Greek court ruled that Ford and her siblings had no right to her father's inheritance due to Greek law. In 2011, Ford pleaded guilty to driving under the influence and child endangerment, and was sentenced to two years' probation.

See also
Ford family tree

References

External links 
 Ford Executive's Management Style Matches Strengths: 'You Can't Put All Like-Minded People Together'

1966 births
Living people
Ford executives
Henry Ford family
Businesspeople from New York City
People from Birmingham, Michigan
American people of Greek descent
Niarchos family